A by-election was held in the Dáil Éireann Wicklow constituency in Ireland on 29 June 1995. It followed the death of Independent Teachta Dála (TD) Johnny Fox on 17 March 1995.

The election was won by Independent Wicklow County Councillor Mildred Fox, daughter of Johnny Fox.

Among the candidates were Senator, Wicklow County Councillor, former and future TD and future Minister Dick Roche, Wicklow County Councillor Tom Honan, future Wicklow County Councillor Nicky Kelly, former Wicklow County Councillor and then husband of sitting TD Liz McManus, John McManus and Wicklow County Councillor Susan Philips.

Result

See also
List of Dáil by-elections
Dáil constituencies

References

External links
http://irelandelection.com/election.php?elecid=102&constitid=9&electype=2
https://www.electionsireland.org/result.cfm?election=1992B&cons=235&ref=113

1995 in Irish politics
1995 elections in the Republic of Ireland
27th Dáil
By-elections in the Republic of Ireland
Elections in County Wicklow
June 1995 events in Europe